Willie Brooks Wells Jr. (October 23, 1922 – January 4, 1994) was an American Negro league shortstop in the 1940s.

A native of Austin, Texas, Wells was the son of Baseball Hall of Famer and fellow Negro leaguer Willie Wells. He broke into the Negro leagues in 1944, and played alongside his father on the 1948 Memphis Red Sox. Wells died in Austin in 1994 at age 71.

References

External links
 and Seamheads

1922 births
1994 deaths
Chicago American Giants players
Memphis Red Sox players
20th-century African-American sportspeople
Baseball infielders